John Koehler Gerhart (November 27, 1907 – January 9, 1981) was a United States Air Force four-star general, and served as commander, North American Air Defense Command under Presidents Kennedy and Johnson.

Biography
He was born in Saginaw, Michigan, in 1907, and graduated from the University of Chicago in 1928 with a bachelor's degree in philosophy. On October 12, 1929, he was commissioned a second lieutenant in the Air Corps Reserve after graduating from Advanced Flying School at Kelly Field, Texas.

Gerhart's first tour of duty was at Mitchel Field, New York. This was followed by various assignments, including several years as a flight test pilot in both powered aircraft and gliders. He graduated from the Air Corps Tactical School in April 1941.

Shortly after the attack on Pearl Harbor, General Gerhart joined the newly formed Eighth Air Force. In July 1942 he went to England with the first contingent of the Eighth Air Force. In June 1943 he assumed command of the 95th Bomb Group, Eighth Air Force, and later became commander of the 93rd Combat Bomb Wing which comprised four groups of B-17 Flying Fortresses.

In early 1946, Gerhart returned to London and Paris for a year as air adviser to the American Delegation participating along with the major allies in drafting the Balkan and Italian peace treaties.

On return to Washington in January 1947, he served successively as director of the Legislative and Liaison Division, chief of statistical services in the Office of the Comptroller, and as chief of staff of Joint Task Force Three which conducted the first thermonuclear tests at Eniwetok Atoll in the spring of 1951. During the period of his duty with the Air Force Comptroller, he also graduated from the Harvard Business School (AMP-13).

Gerhart was appointed as Joint Chiefs of Staff adviser to the Planning Board of the National Security Council in March 1953, and after two years in that capacity, was designated chief of the Military Assistance Advisory Group to the United Kingdom. One year later, Gerhart became the commander of the United States Twelfth Air Force in Germany. He returned to the United States in July 1957 to become the first deputy chief of staff, plans and programs, in Air Force Headquarters – the job he held until appointed by President John F. Kennedy to be commander-in-chief of the North American Air Defense Command, August 1, 1962. He retired from the Air Force on March 31, 1965, and died January 9, 1981.

Awards and decorations
Gerhart's decorations included the Silver Star with two oak leaf clusters, Legion of Merit, Distinguished Flying Cross, Bronze Star, Air Medal with two oak leaf clusters, French Croix de Guerre with Palm, and Belgian Croix de guerre with Palm. He was rated a command pilot, combat and technical observer.

 Army Distinguished Service Medal
 Silver Star with two oak leaf clusters
 Legion of Merit
 Distinguished Flying Cross
 Bronze Star
 Air Medal with two oak leaf clusters
 French Croix de Guerre with palm
 Belgian Croix de guerre with palm

Effective dates of promotion
First Lieutenant (temporary) March 12, 1935 (permanent) August 1, 1935
Captain (permanent) January 6, 1940
Major (temporary) March 21, 1941 (permanent) January 6, 1947
Lieutenant Colonel (temporary) January 5, 1942
Colonel (temporary) September 1, 1943 (permanent) April 2, 1948
Brigadier General (temporary) January 23, 1945 (permanent) October 9, 1951
Major General (temporary) December 3, 1952 (permanent) April 7, 1954
Lieutenant General (temporary) June 30, 1957
General (temporary) August 1, 1962

References

United States Air Force generals
United States Army Air Forces personnel of World War II
Recipients of the Distinguished Flying Cross (United States)
Recipients of the Legion of Merit
Recipients of the Silver Star
University of Chicago alumni
Harvard Business School alumni
People from Saginaw, Michigan
1907 births
1981 deaths
Recipients of the Croix de guerre (Belgium)
Recipients of the Croix de Guerre (France)
Recipients of the Air Medal
United States Army Air Forces officers
Military personnel from Michigan